was founded in 1960 in Fukuoka City, and currently has twenty departments and six graduate schools. It is a private university.

Undergraduate Faculties and departments
Faculty of Economics
Department of Economics
Faculty of Commerce
Department of Commerce
Department of Tourism Industry
Evening School of Commerce
Department of Commerce
Department of Tourism Industry
Faculty of Management
Department of International Management 	
Department of Industrial Management
Faculty of Engineering
Department of Mechanical Engineering
Department of Electrical Engineering 	
Department of Applied Chemistry and Biochemistry
Department of Department of Civil and Urban Design Engineering
Department of Architecture
Department of Biorobotics
Department of Housing and Interior Design
Faculty of Fine Arts
Department of Fine Art
Department of Craft Art
Department of Design
Department of Photography
Faculty of International Studies of Culture
Department of International Studies of Culture
Department of Regional Studies of Culture
Department of Clinical Psychology
Faculty of Information Science
Department of Information Science

Teachers
Ikkō Narahara (photographer)
Shōji Ueda (photographer)

Alumni
Shunji Dodo (photographer)
Tatsunori Fujie (basketball player)
Yuji Funayama (basketball player)
Park Joon-Kyung (footballer)
Kōji Shiraishi (film director)
Masashi Kishimoto (manga artist)
Masaaki Yuasa (film director)

Notes

External links
Official site (English)

Private universities and colleges in Japan
Universities and colleges in Fukuoka Prefecture
Educational institutions established in 1960
1960 establishments in Japan